Bob Black Jack is a California-bred colt by Stormy Jack (a son of Bertrando), out of the mare Molly's Prospector. He holds the Santa Anita Racetrack track records for 6 and 7 furlongs. His earnings amount to over 300 times his sale price of $4,500.

Bob Black Jack was the pace setter in the 2008 Kentucky Derby and finished second in the Santa Anita Derby behind Colonel John.

In the  Grade I Malibu Stakes, he surpassed the record time set by Spectacular Bid in 1980.

After a 14-month layoff, the lightly raced Bob Black Jack came back to wire the field in the San Carlos Handicap by 2 and 1/2 lengths over the favored 2009 Breeders' Cup Sprint winner, Dancing in Silks.

References

2005 racehorse births
Thoroughbred family 14-c
Racehorses bred in Kentucky
Racehorses trained in the United States
Horse racing track record setters